Ansnes is a village in the municipality of Hitra in Trøndelag county, Norway. The village is located along the Fillfjorden on the northeastern coast of the island of Hitra. There is a bridge from Ansnes to the island of Fjellværsøya to the east. The village has a fishing harbor and is home to many aspects of the fishing industry.

References

Hitra
Villages in Trøndelag